The Central Control Commission (Tsentral'naya Kontrol'naya Komissiya) was a supreme disciplinary body (since 1934 within the Central Committee) of the Communist Party of the Soviet Union. Its members were elected at plenary sessions of the Central Committee.

History and function 
At first there was a single Control Commission, which in 1921 was divided into the Central Auditing Commission, responsible for financial control, and the Central Control Commission, responsible for controlling party discipline. The Party Control Committee oversaw the party discipline of the Party members and candidate Party members in terms of their observance of the programme and regulations of the Party, state discipline and Party ethics. It administered punishments, including expulsions from the Party. The Party Control Committee also considered the appeals of Party members punished by their local Party organizations.

According to the Charter, the composition of the Central Control Commission was elected by the Party Congress; members of the Central Control Commission could not be simultaneously members of the Central Committee. The local control bodies of the RCP (b) were regional control commissions, district control commissions, city control commissions, etc.

The activities of the party control bodies largely helped not only to reduce the number of violators of party and ethical norms in the party, but also to somewhat improve the poor quality of the management system. An important element of party control was the lack of public control over the Soviet political system from below.

Leadership 
The chairman of the Party Control Committee was a powerful figure in Party politics, and usually held membership in the Politburo. Notable chairmen included Andrei Andreyev, Nikolay Shvernik, Arvid Pelshe, Mikhail Solomentsev and Boris Pugo.

In 1920-1923, as head of the CCC, People's Commissar of Rabkrin (Stalin) was in charge of its activities on the national level.

Chairman of the Central Control Commission:
Valerian Kuibyshev (1923–1926)
Grigol Ordzhonikidze (1926–1930)
Andrey Andreyev (1930–1931)
Jānis Rudzutaks (1931–1934)

Chairman of the Party Control Commission of the Central Committee:
Lazar Kaganovich (1934–1935)
Nikolai Yezhov (1935–1939)
Andrey Andreyev (1939–1952)

Chairman of the Party Control Committee of the Central Committee:
Matvei Shkiryatov (1952–1954)
Vacant (1954–1956)
Nikolay Shvernik (1956–1966)
Arvīds Pelše (1966–1983)
Mikhail Solomentsev (1983–1988)
Boris Pugo (1988–1990)

Chairman of the Central Control Commission:
Boris Pugo (1990–1991)
Yevgeny Makhov (1991)

See also 
 Central Auditing Commission - another control organ of the  CPSU

References

External links
 Central Control Commission of the All-Union Communist Party (Bolsheviks) (Центральная контрольная комиссия ВКП(б)). Great Soviet Encyclopedia (bse.sci-lib.com).
 Central Control Commission of the All-Union Communist Party (Bolsheviks) (Центральная контрольная комиссия ВКП(б)). Great Soviet Encyclopedia (www.booksite.ru)
 Commission of Partisan Control (Комиссия партийного контроля). Great Soviet Encyclopedia (www.booksite.ru)

References 
Bodies of the Communist Party of the Soviet Union
1923 establishments in the Soviet Union
1991 disestablishments in the Soviet Union